Giselda Zani (1909 in Italy – 1975 in Argentina) was a Uruguayan poet, short story writer and art critic of Italian origin. A member of the Generación del 45, she had a career as a journalist and diplomat in Buenos Aires in Argentina.

Works
 La costa despierta (The Wide-awake Coast) (1930)
 Por vínculos sutiles (Tenuous Links) (1958), a collection of short stories

Awards 
 Emecé Literary Prize (1957)

See also
 List of contemporary writers from northern Uruguay
 Uruguayan literature

References

External links 
 Giselda Zani in the Ibero-American Institute's catalogue

1909 births
1975 deaths
20th-century Italian short story writers
20th-century Italian women writers
20th-century Italian writers
20th-century Uruguayan poets
20th-century Uruguayan women writers
20th-century journalists
Italian art critics
Italian women art critics
Italian emigrants to Uruguay
Uruguayan art critics
Uruguayan diplomats
Uruguayan journalists
Uruguayan women journalists
Uruguayan women short story writers
Uruguayan women poets
Women diplomats